Huadu Stadium is a stadium in Guangzhou, China. It was a venue for the 16th Asian Games and has hosted some international football matches.

References

Football venues in Guangzhou
Venues of the 2010 Asian Games
Sports venues in Guangzhou